The 2013 Pacific Rugby Cup was the eighth edition of the Pacific Rugby Cup competition. The tournament featured national 'A' rugby union teams from Fiji, Samoa, Tonga, Japan and Argentina. Additionally, four Super Rugby development sides joined the five Pacific sides as core teams for the first time. These Australian teams had previously only been opposition sides for the core teams and were not in contention for the title.

The tournament was played in Australia. The teams were split into two pools and a single round robin series was played in each pool, with the top team in each pool playing in the final for the PRC title. Argentina's Pampas XV won the Cup, going through the tournament undefeated.

Teams

The 5 Pacific core teams:
 Pampas XV 
 Fiji Warriors 

 

The 4 Australian core teams:
 ACT XV
 Gen Blue (Watarahs A)
 Reds A
 Western Force A 
	
Additional Australian opposition:
 NSW Under 20
 Queensland Under 20

Standings

Pool A

Pool B

Pool matches

Round 1

Round 2

Round 3

Round 4

Round 5

Round 6

Finals

3rd place play-off

Final

References

External links
FORU website 

World Rugby Pacific Challenge
2014 rugby union tournaments for national teams
Pacific Rugby Cup
Pacific Rugby Cup
Pacific Rugby Cup
Pacific Rugby Cup
Pacific Rugby Cup
Pacific Rugby Cup
Pacific